The Fortran subroutine NLPQLP, a newer version of NLPQL, solves smooth nonlinear programming problems
by a sequential quadratic programming (SQP) algorithm. The new version is specifically
tuned to run under distributed systems.
In case of computational errors, caused for example by inaccurate function or gradient evaluations,
a non-monotone line search is activated. The code is easily transformed to C by f2c and is widely used in academia and industry.

References

External links
 http://klaus-schittkowski.de/nlpqlp.htm
 https://www.schittkowski.de/numericalsoftware_nlpqlp.php

Mathematical software